Rauna is a village in Rauna Parish, Smiltene Municipality in the Vidzeme region of Latvia. It is the administrative center of Rauna Parish. The community developed around a medieval bishop's castle.

External links
 

Villages in Latvia
Kreis Wenden
Smiltene Municipality
Vidzeme